Cerithiella seymouriana is a species of very small sea snail, a marine gastropod mollusk in the family Newtoniellidae. It was described by Strebel, in 1908.

Description 
The maximum recorded shell length is 8.2 mm.

Habitat 
Minimum recorded depth is 94 m. Maximum recorded depth is 213 m.

References

 Engl W. (2012) Shells of Antarctica. Hackenheim: Conchbooks. 402 pp.

Newtoniellidae
Gastropods described in 1908